Vadistanbul is an elevated station and the western terminus of the F3 funicular line of the Istanbul Metro. The station consists of a bay platform with one track inside a Spheroid glass structure within the Vadistanbul Shopping Center. The station is the first and only rapid transit station in Turkey to be directly connected to a privately owned structure. Trains operate to Seyrantepe in seven minute intervals daily between 8:00 and 22:00.

Vadistanbul station connects to the 2nd floor of the Vadistanbul shopping center near the food court and was opened on 29 October 2017.

References

Rail transport in Istanbul
Istanbul metro stations
Railway stations opened in 2017
Sarıyer
Funicular railways in Turkey
2017 establishments in Turkey
Istanbul Central Business District